Helen Boucher is Dean of Tufts University School of Medicine and Chief Academic Officer of Tufts Medicine, the parent health system for Tufts Medical Center in Boston. Prior to this, she served as Chief of the Division of Geographic Medicine and Infectious Diseases at Tufts Medical Center, a Professor of Medicine at Tufts University School of Medicine, and Director of the Stuart B. Levy Center for Integrated Management of Antimicrobial Resistance at Tufts.

Education 
Helen Boucher graduated with an undergraduate degree in English from College of the Holy Cross, before earning her medical degree from the University of Texas Medical School at Houston.

Career 
In October of 2022, Boucher was named Dean of Tufts University School of Medicine. Boucher had served as the school’s dean ad interim since July 2021, when she was also named chief academic officer for Tufts Medicine, the parent health system for Tufts Medical Center in Boston.

Boucher has worked as a physician in the field of infectious diseases since the mid-1990s. She is a professor at Tufts University and the founding co-director of the Center for Integrated Management of Antimicrobial Resistance along with Ralph Isberg. She has also served as the Director of the Infectious Diseases Fellowship Program at the Tufts Medical Center, and until assuming the deanship at Tufts University School of Medicine was Chief of the Division of Geographic Medicine and Infectious Diseases. As a scholar, her research focuses on drug-resistant medical infections. She has also commented on public medical issues in publications including the Washington Post.

Boucher is also a member of the Presidential Advisory Council on Combating Antibiotic-Resistant Bacteria, and is an associate editor of Infectious Diseases and a member of the editorial board for Antimicrobial Agents and Chemotherapy. Boucher is also treasurer of the Infectious Diseases Society of America.

References

Living people
Tufts University School of Medicine faculty
College of the Holy Cross alumni
University of Texas Health Science Center at Houston alumni
Tufts University faculty
21st-century American physicians
20th-century American physicians
20th-century American women physicians
American medical researchers
Year of birth missing (living people)
21st-century American women